William John Blair,  (born 4 March 1955) is an English historian, archaeologist, and academic, who specialises in Anglo-Saxon England. He is Emeritus Professor of Medieval History and Archaeology at the University of Oxford, and a Fellow of The Queen's College, Oxford. He gave the 2013 Ford Lectures at the University of Oxford.

Early life and education
Blair was born on 4 March 1955 in Woking, Surrey, England. His father was Claude Blair, a museum curator and "one of the foremost authorities on historic European metalwork, especially arms and armour", and his mother was Joan Mary Greville Blair (née Drinkwater).

Blair was educated at St John's School, Leatherhead, a private school in Leatherhead, Surrey. He then studied at Brasenose College, Oxford, graduating with a first-class Bachelor of Arts (BA) degree in 1976. He remained at Brasenose College to undertake postgraduate research and completed his Doctor of Philosophy (DPhil) degree in 1983. His doctoral thesis was titled Landholding, Church and Settlement in Surrey before 1300: this subsequently became the basis of his first book, Early Medieval Surrey (1991).

Academic career
During his doctoral research, Blair was a Junior Research Fellow at Brasenose College, Oxford. In 1981, he was elected a Fellow of The Queen's College, Oxford. Since then, he has been a praelector and tutor in history at the college. On 1 October 2006, he was awarded a Title of Distinction by the University of Oxford as Professor of Medieval History and Archaeology. He retired in October 2020 and was made an emeritus fellow of The Queen's College.

Blair gave the 2013 Ford Lectures at the University of Oxford. The lecture series was tiled "Building the Anglo-Saxon Landscape".

On 5 May 1983, Blair was elected Fellow of the Society of Antiquaries of London (FSA). He was elected Fellow of the British Academy (FBA) in 2008.

Personal life
In 2005, Blair married Kanerva Heikkinen. Together they have two children; one daughter and one son.

Selected works

References

1955 births
Living people
People educated at St John's School, Leatherhead
Alumni of Brasenose College, Oxford
British medievalists
Anglo-Saxon studies scholars
English archaeologists
Historians of the University of Oxford
English male non-fiction writers
Fellows of the British Academy
Fellows of The Queen's College, Oxford
Fellows of the Society of Antiquaries of London
Contributors to the Victoria County History